Anna Burnet (born 27 September 1992)  is an Olympic Silver Medallist and two time World Champion in sailings Mixed multihull Olympic discipline. She lives in Scotland. In 2020 she became world champion in the Nacra 17 World Championship with partner John Gimson. They were selected for the British Olympic team and gained silver medals at the 2020 Summer Olympics. The pair continued their good run to win the 2021 World and European Championships.

Life
She was born in 1992. Her father was keen on sailing and her uncle, an inspiration, was the sailor Sir Peter Blake. As a teenager she went to train with Olympian Joe Glanfield who helped her to plan her ambitions to think about attending one in order to win at one later. She was sailing in Optimist class and became the female national champion. She moved onto the 420 class and in time to 470 boats.

She took a degree in Sports Studies at Southampton University.

She and Gimson won a gold medal during Kiel Week in 2018.

She represented the UK, along with partner John Gimson, in the Nacra 17 class at the 2020 Summer Olympics in Tokyo. This fitted in with her plans as she and Gimson had decided to compete at the 2024 Summer Olympics in Paris. In 2020 the world Championship was in Australia, and as they practised there they had to wear face masks to prevent inhaling smoke from the 2020 Australian wildfire. They won and were world champions when the 2020 Olympics was postponed for a year and other important events were cancelled as a result of the COVID-19 pandemic.

They were selected for the British Olympic team which was then planned to be in staged in 2020 in Tokyo. They were chosen before their British rival sailing team of Nicola Boniface and Ben Saxton. At the Tokyo Olympics they raced their boat at Enoshima alongside their Italian training partners of Ruggero Tita and Caterina Banti. They finished behind them and were awarded with silver medals.

References

External links 
 
 
 

Living people
1992 births
English female sailors (sport)
Olympic medalists in sailing
Olympic sailors of Great Britain
Medalists at the 2020 Summer Olympics
Sailors at the 2020 Summer Olympics – Nacra 17
Nacra 17 class sailors
Nacra 17 class world champions
Sportspeople from London
People from Hammersmith
Olympic silver medallists for Great Britain